The Pala dynasty of Kamarupa kingdom ruled from 900 CE. Like the Pala Empire of Bengal, the first ruler in this dynasty was elected, which probably explains the name of this dynasty "Pala". But unlike the Palas of Bengal, who were Buddhists, the Palas of Kamarupa were Hindus. The Hindu orthodoxy drew their lineage from the earlier Varman dynasty and thus ultimately from Narakasura i.e. Bhauma dynasty. The dynasty is unrelated to the previous Varman and Mlecchna dynasty.

The Palas were the last dynasty to rule Kamarupa.  After the collapse of the Pala rule, Kamarupa disintegrated, to be followed in due course by the Ahom, Chutia, Kachari kingdoms and the confederate rule of the Baro-Bhuyans.

History 
It is interesting to note that the term "Kamarupa" rarely appeared in the records of the Pala rulers; instead they used Pragjyotisha, the legendary kingdom of the epics, to legitimise their authority. The Pala kings of Kamarupa assumed the title of paramadaivata paramabhattāraka mahārājādirāja (the imperial title of the Guptas), sri-vārāha (the one who can trace his origin to Varāha) and prāigjyotisādhipati (the ruler of Prāgjyotisa).
The Pala dynasty came to an end when Kamarupa was invaded by the Gaur king Ramapala (c. 1072-1126). Timgyadeva was made the governor of Kamarupa who ruled between 1110 and 1126. Timgyadeva threw off the yoke of the Pala king and ruled independently for some years when he was attacked and replaced by Vaidyadeva under Ramapala's son Kumarapala. Vaidyadeva, who ruled between 1126 and 1140, declared independence within four years of his rule after the death of Kumarapala. Both Timgyadeva and Vaidyadeva issued grants in the style of the Kamarupa kings (three copper plates attached to the seal of the Kamarupa kings by a ring).
The work of the pala dynasty of Kamarupa is reflected in the Madan Kamdev sculpture.

Rulers
 Brahma Pala (900-920)
 Ratna Pala (920-960)
 Indra Pala (960-990)
 Go Pala, also Gopalavarman (990-1015)
 Harsha Pala (1015-1035)
 Dharma Pala (1035-1060)
 Jaya Pala (1075-1100)

References

Bibliography

 Sircar, D. C. The Bhauma-Naraka or the Pala Dynasty of Brahmapala, The Comprehensive History of Assam, ed H. K. Barpujari, Guwahati, 1990.
 
 * 

 
900 establishments
10th-century establishments in India